László Cseri (also known as Cerva, June 6, 1912 – December 29, 1998) was a Hungarian field hockey player who competed in the 1936 Summer Olympics.

He was born and died in Budapest.

In 1936 he was a member of the Hungarian team which was eliminated in the group stage of the Olympic tournament. He played all three matches as forward and scored one goal.

External links
profile

1912 births
1998 deaths
Hungarian male field hockey players
Olympic field hockey players of Hungary
Field hockey players at the 1936 Summer Olympics
Sportspeople from Budapest
20th-century Hungarian people